The Haestingas, or Heastingas or Hæstingas, were one of the tribes of Anglo-Saxon Britain. Not very much is known about them. They settled in what became East Sussex sometime before the end of the 8th century. A 12th-century source suggested that they were conquered by Offa of Mercia, in 771. They were also recorded in the Anglo-Saxon Chronicle (ASC) as being an autonomous grouping as late as the 11th century.

History
The foundation legend of the Kingdom of the South Saxons is given by the Anglo-Saxon Chronicle, which states that in the year AD 477 Ælle arrived at a place called Cymenshore in three ships with his three sons. Traditionally Cymenshore is thought to have been located around the Selsey area, in the south west of Sussex. However the archaeological evidence indicates that the  principal area of settlement in the 5th century, for the South Saxons, has been identified as between the lower Ouse and Cuckmere rivers in East Sussex, based on the number of Anglo-Saxon cemeteries there.

To the east of Pevensey, beyond the  Saxon Shore fort  of Anderitum, on the other side of the estuary and marsh and from there to the border with the Kingdom of Kent, lived a group known as the Haestingas. They gave their name to Hastings.  Not very much is known of the Haestingas but they were believed to be a separate people to the South Saxons; however, there is no archaeological evidence for occupation by Anglo-Saxons in that area of Sussex between the 5th and 8th centuries. Medieval sources and place name evidence suggest that people had begun living there by the late 8th century. Some of the Saxon charters that date from the Kingdom of Sussex provide evidence which suggests the existence of two separate dynasties in Sussex. The charters of King Northelm (or Nunna), who ruled Sussex in the late 7th and early 8th century regularly attest a second king by the name of Watt (or Wattus). The historian  C.T. Chevalier has suggested that Watt may have ruled the Haestingas. This is because place-names with the name Watt or What occur in the Hastings region, but are not found in western Sussex. The theory has been seen as plausible by other historians. Chevalier goes on to suggest that the Haestingas may have been of Frankish origin; however, other historians have rejected this, arguing that it is based on a misinterpretation of place-name evidence.

Towards the end of the 8th century, Kent did not have a secure leadership and the kingdom of Wessex was pursuing an expansionist campaign under Cædwalla; the result was that Kent found itself being raided frequently by the West Saxons. The Anglo-Saxon Chronicle for 686 reported that Cædwalla ravaged Kent with his brother Mul. The following year it said that the people of Kent killed his brother Mul by 'burning' him and that Cædwalla overran Kent (presumably in response to his brother's violent death). In 688 Caedwalla went on a pilgrimage to Rome, why he did this is not reported but he died while he was there.  Stability was then returned to Kent under the new king Wihtred  and also with Ine becoming king of Wessex.  The people of Kent agreed to pay compensation (Weregild)  to Wessex for the taking of Mul's life. The agreement may have included some ceding of border territory, and it has been hypothesized that the overlordship of Haestingas would  have been ceded to Ine as part of this treaty. The southern kingdoms lived in relative peace for the next quarter century.

The peace was shattered by the ascent of Mercian power; the chronicler Simeon of Durham  records the defeat of the gens Hestingorum (the people of Hastings) by Offa of Mercia in 771. Mercian overlordship was ended when they were defeated in 825, by Egbert of Wessex, at the Battle of Ellandun. Egbert went on to annex the territories of Essex, Kent, Surrey and Sussex, suggesting that by this time the Haestingas had been subsumed into Sussex. However it is known that the Haestingas retained a distinct identity till the 11th century as the Anglo-Saxon Chronicle records the Haestingas as having been harried by the Danes in 1011.

The 19th century writer, Grant Allen argued that the Hastings region was predestined to be a separate region between the rest of Sussex and Kent, to later join with Sussex. Effectively isolated, the region was separated from the rest of Sussex and England by the marshland of the Pevensey Levels lying to the west and the forest of the Weald to the north, while Romney Marsh separates the region from Kent to the east.  The kingdom of the Haestingas went on to join Sussex and become the rape of Hastings.

Origins
It has been suggested that the Haestingas were of Frankish origin, based on Watt being a sub-king to the South Saxons and there being a place-name of Watten in northern France.  However, the more probable explanation is that the Haestingas were Jutes who migrated from Kent. The Frankish princess Bertha had arrived in Kent around 580 to marry the king Æthelberht of Kent. Bertha was already a Christian and had brought a bishop, Liudhard, with her across the Channel.  Kent was the earliest Anglo-Saxon kingdom to be evangelized and it would have been at this time the simplified Christian burial was introduced. As there is little archaeological evidence for the Haestingas it is likely that they were already Christian, when they moved to Sussex .

Etymology
Haestingas is from Old English and means settlement of  Haesta's People. Haesta would have been the chieftain or ruler and -ingas means People. It is possible that the founder may have been a forebear of the Viking leader Hastein (who invaded Kent in 892), but there is no evidence to support this hypothesis.

See also
Rape of Hastings
History of Sussex
Anglo-Saxon England
Anglo-Saxon settlement of Britain

Notes

References

Citations
 
 
 

 
 
 
 

Peoples of Anglo-Saxon England
Hastings
History of East Sussex
Petty kingdoms of England
States and territories established in the 5th century
History of Sussex